Williams-Yulee v. Florida Bar, 575 U.S. 433 (2015), was a United States Supreme Court case in which the court held that the First Amendment did not prohibit states from barring judges and judicial candidates from personally soliciting funds for their election campaigns since that specific restriction on candidate's speech was deemed to be narrowly tailored to serve the compelling interest of keeping the judiciary impartial. It is a rare instance of a government regulation passing strict scrutiny.

At issue in the case was a Florida law which barred judges from personally soliciting campaign funds. However, judges could still set up a committee in order to raise campaign funds. Williams-Yulee was a judicial candidate in Hillsborough County, Florida, who sent out a soliciting letter for campaign contributions. She also posted the letter to her website. Williams-Yulee lost her campaign to the incumbent judge. The Florida Bar filed a complaint against her for violating the law shortly afterwards.

The effects of the ruling has been a point of discussion among academics. For instance, Josh Wheeler writing for SCOTUSBlog raised concerns about greater restrictions on judicial speech and the weakening of the strict scrutiny standard.

References

External links 

SCOTUSblog coverage

2015 in United States case law
Campaign finance in the United States
United States elections case law
United States Free Speech Clause case law
United States Supreme Court cases of the Roberts Court
United States Supreme Court cases
American Bar Association
Florida elections